, (born Kusaka Hidezaburō; May 1840 – 20 August 1864) was a samurai of the Japanese domain of Chōshū who was active during the Bakumatsu period and a key proponent of the sonnō jōi movement.

Early life
He was born Kusaka Hidezaburō in 1840 in Hagi, a town in Nagato Province in Chōshū Domain.  He was the third son of the physician Kusaka Ryōteki and Tomiko; their eldest son was named Genki, and their second died while still young.  The family belonged to a 7th-rank samurai family, but received a stipend of only 25 koku of rice.

From a young age Kusaka learned the Four Books by rote at a private juku that Takasugi Shinsaku also attended.  He then attended the domain's Kōseikan medical school.  At fourteen his mother died, and the following year so did his brother Genki and then mere days later his father as well.  As the sole surviving member of his family Genzui became the head of the family and the family's medical practice; he thus shaved his head and took the name Genzui.  At 17 his academic achievements won Genzui a dormitory placement at the Kōseikan at the domain's expense.

Physical characteristics
He was slightly wall-eyed in one eye. He was noted for the quality of his loud voice.

Tutelage under Yoshida Shōin

In 1856 Nakamura Michitarō recommended Kusaka to study in Kyushu.  He travelled around Kyushu visiting sights and well-known literary figures, and wrote poetry that later appeared in a collected volume.  While visiting Kumamoto, the samurai  strongly encouraged Kusaka to study under Yoshida Shōin, as had a friend of his brother's for some time.  Upon returning to Hagi he wrote Shōin, and with the help of a friend of Shōin's, Tsuchiya Shōkai, applied to study with the master.

In his letter to Shōin, Kusaka commented: "As at the time of the Battle of Kōan the foreign envoys should be cut down, in which case the Americans will surely attack.  When they do it will probably provide the chance to arouse the loose discipline of the samurai into a vigorous national defence."  Shōin returned the letter with a note of condemnation in the margin reading: "Your argument is frivolous and its judgement shallow; it does not come from sincerity.  I hate that sort of writing and that sort of person.  It is already too late to cut down the American envoys.  To employ dead old ways to solve problems in a completely changed modern world demonstrates shallow judgement.  You would be better off building your sincerity than wasting time with such tedious speciousness.  Remarks not put into practice serve no purpose."

Death
In 20 August 1864 during the Kinmon incident outside the Kyoto Imperial Palace, he was wounded by a rifle fire, and committed suicide to avoid capture.

Notes

References

Works cited

Further reading

 
 
 
 

1840 births
1864 deaths
People of Bakumatsu
Meiji Restoration
People from Yamaguchi Prefecture
People from Chōshū domain
Deified Japanese people